Michael Benjamin (born November 1, 1969) was born Michael Benjamin Bonheur in New York City, New York, United States. Benjamin works as a private investor focusing on Internet companies. He was an unsuccessful Republican candidate for the United States Senate in 2004.

Personal background
He is the son of an Iranian Jewish father that immigrated to the United States from Tehran in 1950 and a Catholic mother who immigrated from Honduras.

Soon after Michael's birth the family moved to San Pedro Sula, Honduras, where his father was relocated with his job at Bank of America. After about one year in San Pedro Sula they moved to the capital, Tegucigalpa, for another year. In 1971, the family moved to Lima, Peru and in 1973, they moved to Quito, Ecuador. Michael attended school at the American Cotopaxi Academy.

Several years later, in 1976, the family moved back to the U.S. They settled in the New York City suburb of Greenwich, Connecticut, where they lived for four years. Michael attended North Street Elementary School. In 1980, the family relocated to Bogotá, Colombia. Michael attended the American school Colegio Nueva Granada. Soon after, in 1982, they moved to Mexico City, where Michael attended the American School Foundation. They left Mexico in 1987 and, after a brief stay in San Francisco, moved back to Greenwich. Michael attended his senior year at Greenwich High School. While there, he was awarded High Honors by the NAACP for his writing in recognition of Black History Month.

Benjamin attended New York University where he studied economics and Western literature and was elected president of the student government for his junior and senior years. He received his Bachelor of Arts in 1992 and shortly thereafter began work as assistant to the president of Richter & Co., Inc., an investment bank in midtown Manhattan known primarily for launching Cerberus Partners, L.P. a major American hedge fund. He later worked in the insurance industry with American Corporate Benefits, Inc. and Guardian Life Insurance Company, before starting his own securities trading and investments business in 1997.

The New York Benevolence Council, Inc.
Along with another graduate of NYU, Benjamin founded the New York Benevolence Council, Inc. in 1993, a non-profit organization which provided mentoring and tutoring in New York City public schools, coordinated food and clothing drives, and organized fund-raisers in support of various humanitarian causes. At its height in the late 1990s and early 2000s, NYBC had over 1,000 young professionals serving as volunteer tutors and mentors to public school students, and organizing fund-raising benefits primarily for women and children who were victims of domestic violence. In 2002, New York City Mayor Michael Bloomberg awarded NYBC a community service award for its work on behalf of victims of domestic violence. In 2003, after a 10-year run, NYBC donated its assets to various charitable organizations and ceased operations.

Political career

1996 Congressional Race
In 1996, at the age of 26, Benjamin was the Republican nominee for the U.S. Congress from New York's 8th district, covering parts of Manhattan and Brooklyn. Although he lost the race, Benjamin received notable endorsements from Mayor Rudolph W. Giuliani and the New York Post. The chairman of the campaign was John C. Whitehead, former chairman of Goldman Sachs & Co. and of the Federal Reserve Bank of New York. Whitehead went on to head the Lower Manhattan Development Corporation, the organization in charge of rebuilding the World Trade Center after September 11 attacks.

2004 Senate Race
In January 2003, Benjamin declared his intentions to run for the United States Senate against incumbent Democrat Chuck Schumer. Initially regarded as a long shot, Benjamin stunned many observers when he quickly raised over $820,000 for the campaign from over 20,000 different individuals.

The conservative Benjamin battled with the state GOP, which decided in August 2004 there would be no primary. Despite his impressive fundraising, the Republican State Committee nominated moderate Assemblyman Howard Mills to run against Schumer. Mills went on to lose the election in the largest landslide for a Senate seat in the history of New York.

Benjamin publicly accused New York GOP Chairman Sandy Treadwell and Governor George Pataki of trying to muscle him out of the Senate race and undermine the democratic process. Many Republican voters were upset when Benjamin was denied the chance to engage in a primary. He had campaigned throughout New York, visiting all 62 counties on several occasions, and had built strong support among political leaders and community groups. In addition, Benjamin received the majority of his financial support in small donations, with only $2,500 from Political Action Committees (PACs). Mills had raised $200,000 less than Benjamin, and a large portion of his campaign contributions came from PACs.

Many New York Republicans were irked again in 2006 when a similar situation unfolded as the state party decided to nominate Westchester County District Attorney Jeanine Pirro over conservative lawyer Ed Cox, even though Cox had raised over $1.3 million to Pirro's $400,000. There has not been a Republican primary for Senator since 1992.

His platform included simplifying the tax code, lowering taxes, reducing government spending, Social Security private accounts, a strong national defense, and a no-nonsense approach toward Iran, Syria and North Korea. His platform advocated for school choice for "all parents, not just the rich". Benjamin supported banning partial-birth abortion, except for cases where the mother's life is at risk, and abolishing unfunded Medicaid mandates on municipalities. He also stated he wanted to bring jobs back to New York and limit government intervention in the economy. He espoused many very conservative opinions including support for the war in Iraq and supported both the Patriot Act and the inclusion of Iran as part of the Axis of Evil by President Bush.

Electoral history

Notes

External links
Benjamin for Senate 2004 Website, Archive of www.benjamin2004.com
New York Times profile
New York Benevolence Council Website, Archive of www.nybc.us
Save New York Website, Archive of www.savenewyork.org
National Iranian American Council

1969 births
American financiers
American investors
American money managers
Businesspeople in insurance
American people of Honduran descent
American politicians of Iranian descent
Jewish American people in New York (state) politics
Living people
New York (state) Republicans
New York University alumni
Politicians from New York City
Greenwich High School alumni
21st-century American Jews